Jean Mitchell (9 July 1912 – 8 May 2006) was a British sailor. She competed with her husband Roy in the Star event at the 1960 Summer Olympics.

References

External links
 

1912 births
2006 deaths
British female sailors (sport)
Olympic sailors of Great Britain
Sailors at the 1960 Summer Olympics – Star